The 2020 Amex-Istanbul Challenger was a professional tennis tournament played on hard courts. It was the 33rd edition of the tournament which was part of the 2020 ATP Challenger Tour. It took place in Istanbul, Turkey between 19 and 25 October 2020.

Singles main-draw entrants

Seeds

 1 Rankings are as of 12 October 2020.

Other entrants
The following players received wildcards into the singles main draw: 
  Altuğ Çelikbilek
  Marsel İlhan
  Ergi Kırkın

The following players received entry from the qualifying draw:
  Borna Gojo
  Tristan Lamasine
  Mackenzie McDonald
  Nino Serdarušić

The following players received entry as lucky losers:
  Teymuraz Gabashvili
  Alexey Vatutin

Champions

Singles

 Ilya Ivashka def.  Martin Kližan 6–1, 6–4.

Doubles

 Ariel Behar /  Gonzalo Escobar def.  Robert Galloway /  Nathaniel Lammons 4–6, 6–3, [10–7].

References

2020 ATP Challenger Tour
2020
October 2020 sports events in Turkey
2020 in Turkish tennis